Cape Crillon ("Nishinotoro-misaki" (Cape Nishinotoro in Japanese)) is the southernmost point of Sakhalin. The cape was named by Frenchman Jean-François de La Pérouse, who was the first European to discover it.

A Russian weather station, a lighthouse and a military base are all situated at Cape Crillon today. Additionally, the cape is the Russian terminus of the proposed Sakhalin–Hokkaido Tunnel that would connect Japan and Russia by rail.

On the western coast of the cape is the rock formation formerly known in Japanese as Kinfugan (金敷岩, literally "Anvil Rock").

History
In 1808, Mamiya Rinzō was dispatched by the Tokugawa shogunate to survey Sakhalin. Having arrived at the Matsumae domain outpost of Shiranushi on the southern tip of Cape Crillon, he was directed by local Ainu to a place called  where the remains of rammed earth walls were found.

In 1905, there were discovered Matsumae documents to the effect that the castle had been built by Imai Kanehira.

Current archaeological evidence indicates the castle was a colonial product of the Yuan dynasty. According to the Yuanshi, the general Yorotai (楊兀魯帶) crossed the sea and established frontier garrisons on Sakhalin.

References

Crillon